Ananías Maidana (26 July 192330 October 2010) was a teacher and politician in Paraguay. For years he was a political prisoner under the dictatorship of Alfredo Stroessner. He later became secretary-general of the Paraguayan Communist Party, and in the 2008 election he was a candidate for the senate for the Socialist Patriotic Alliance, the political coalition in which the PCP participated.

Childhood and youth
Ananías Maidana was born in 1923 in Encarnación, Paraguay, where he finished his high school education. Shortly after his graduation, persecution by the government forced him to move to Asunción, where he lived clandestinely and illegally. He wanted to finish his professorship so he registered in the Normal School Nº2.

First steps in politics
In 1947, after joining the Paraguayan Communist Youth, which was against the dictatorship of Higinio Moríñigo, he was captured, tortured and imprisoned in the Public Jail of Asunción, which was located in the property where the Catholic University now functions. 

Between 1947-49, there were near 4000 political prisoners of all political movements, including 132 officers of the army. Such imprisonment was part of the way the government punished the insurrection, known as the Revolution of Concepción (March–August, 1947).

Militancy and imprisonment
In 1950, he was brutally beaten in the streets by police with a handgun and a rifle. He suffered the sequelae of that incident for years afterwards. He got out of jail in 1952, thanks to the national and international solidarity and the negotiations of his family, which played an essential role in attempts to free prisoners every time Ananías was in jail. Instead of leaving the country, which would have brought a certain amount of security that was not available to him in Paraguay, Ananías fought once again against the dictatorship, from inside the regime, living clandestinely. 

Once Stroessner became president of Paraguay, and later on, an obvious dictator, Ananías was searched extensively by the police. On 3 July 1959, as he was leading the fight against the dictatorship, he was caught and, once again, beaten in the street by the police. The government's intention was to squelch the opposition, led mainly by workers and students, by violently repressing anyone who expressed an ideological difference with the government. This new imprisonment of Ananías Maidana would last twenty years, and would mean practically a lifetime of suffering and torture for him. 

During his imprisonment, Monsignor Benítez  along with six
Chilean deputies and six Chilean senators visited Paraguay to investigate the conditions of the prisoners of Stroessner's government. They could not enter Ananias's cell due to the stench.   It was a cell that he shared with Professor Antonio Maidana, Professor Julio Rojas and Alfredo Alcorta. Sometimes they spent weeks and months without seeing daylight or breathing fresh air. 

When the Catholic Church petitioned for the freedom of those prisoners, especially prisoners like Ananías Maidana that were there only because of their political ideas, Stroessner cynically answered: "Don't worry about them...they're doomed to die in jail."

When the international pressure grew, demanding the freedom of the prisoners, Stroessner confessed, "They are not my prisoners", implying that they were in charge of CIA subordinates. During the Cold War, the United States had enormous influence in Paraguay and generally supported harsh measures against communists and other members of the far left. Maidana was freed in the late 1970s, but exiled, first to Sweden, and then to the Soviet Union, where he denounced the crimes perpetrated by Stroessner and promoted international solidarity through his work as a journalist and a politician.

The democratic era
Once Stroessner was ousted from government, through a "coup d'état" organized by General Rodríguez, Maidana returned to the country. His intention was to support the new democracy, experienced for the first time in the country in more than three decades. Maidana was the secretary-general of the Paraguayan Communist Party and decided to be a candidate in the 2008 election to the senate for the Socialist Patriotic Alliance, the political coalition in which the PCP participated. He did not earn enough votes to be elected, but he continued his labor for the reinforcement of democracy in the country.

Death
Ananías Maidana died of prostate cancer on 30 October 2010, aged 87, in the capital of Paraguay, Asunción.

References

Sources
 BONZI, Antonio, "Proceso histórico del Partido Comunista Paraguayo (Un itinerario de luces y sombras)", Arandura Editorial, Asunción 2001.
 Enciclopedia Virtual Paraguaya - Portal

1923 births
2010 deaths
Deaths from cancer in Paraguay
Deaths from prostate cancer
Operation Condor
Paraguayan activists
Paraguayan communists
Paraguayan Communist Party politicians
Paraguayan exiles
Paraguayan prisoners and detainees
Prisoners and detainees of Paraguay
People from Encarnación, Paraguay
People granted political asylum in the Soviet Union